or , from the English "2D complex", is the affective perception that two-dimensional anime, manga, and light novel characters are more attractive visually, physically or emotionally than people from the real world. The term appeared in the early 1980s in Japan. It has been interpreted by some observers as a genuine sexual orientation in which a person loses interest in real-life people but develops feelings of love and sentimental attachment to characters. This is generally directed towards the behavior and exaggerated physical or facial features of the anime/manga art style, which are perceived to be "ideal" human features.

The 2D complex has been characterized by some scholars as "otaku sexuality". The psychiatrist Saitō Tamaki writes that for otaku, "fiction itself can be a sexual object," with attraction manifesting in an "affinity for fictional contexts." Additional research includes work on its most controversial sub-attraction, lolicon. The affection directed at fictitious characters is sometimes termed fictophilia, which is often enhanced by supernormal stimuli.

Yuu Matsura argues that two-dimensional characters are non-human artifacts and that desire oriented to such characters is not a desire toward humans. She calls the marginalization of fictosexuals or Nijikon  "interpersonal sexuality centrism" (taijin seiai chūshin shugi). In Taiwan, fictosexuality is called Zhǐ-Xìng-Liàn (紙性戀) and Zhǐ-Xìng-Liàn people raise their voice against this centrism.

See also
Moe (slang)
Ero guro
Lolicon
Shotacon
Superflat

References

Moe (slang)
Anime and manga terminology
Anime and manga fandom